Chinatown bus lines are discount intercity bus services, often operated by Chinese Americans. They have been established primarily in the Chinatown communities of the East Coast of the United States since 1998, and similar services operate on the West Coast.  Most Chinatown bus lines are based in the northeastern United States.

The buses have been subject to controversy due to safety issues, and several fatal accidents have occurred. Some companies have been shut down (temporarily or permanently) by regulatory authorities, and others continue to operate with increased oversight. The low-overhead, low-fare services are popular, helping to drive down the fares of competing services such as Greyhound and Megabus.

History

Early history

By the late 20th century, ridership of intercity bus service in the United States had fallen from 140 million annual passengers in 1960 to 40 million in 1990. By 1997, intercity bus transportation accounted for only 3.6 percent of travel in the United States.

Chinese-operated intercity bus service began when the Chinese working class needed to travel to and from New York City, Boston, and Atlantic City. The first companies to offer Chinese intercity bus service had minimal features, including unmarked curbside bus stops and no advertising or customer service; this greatly reduced business overhead. In 1998, two companies began operations: Fung Wah Bus (between New York and Boston) and Eastern Shuttle (between New York and Philadelphia). The bus services originally transported Chinese restaurant workers to and from jobs in Boston, Atlantic City, the Cherry Hill Mall, Philadelphia, Washington, D.C., and other locations. Very few non-Chinese made use of the services at first.

As word of the low-cost services spread, they became popular with non-Chinese travelers. By 2003, the demographics of Chinatown bus passengers and those of larger-corporation passengers were about the same. Reasons cited for the increased ridership included lower fares and more authentic Chinatown experiences. Between 1997 and 2007, Chinatown buses appropriated 60 percent of Greyhound Lines' market share in the northeastern United States. Riders of Chinatown buses made up over half the ridership of northeastern intercity buses, bringing annual intercity ridership to over seven million passengers.

Competition between newly-successful companies, combined with online ticket sales, significantly reduced fares by 2002. Fares were reduced by 400 percent during some price wars, and a number of operators advertised $10 fares. This led to gang violence in which rival bus operators killed or injured each other. Because of their low fares, Chinatown bus lines had very low profit margins; some, like YO! Bus, went bankrupt and ceased operations. However, the Chinatown bus sector made up an increasing number of trips within the northeastern U.S.

Since the late 2000s, competition has come from larger corporations such as Megabus, BoltBus, Washington Deluxe, and Vamoose Bus. Two Chinatown companies (Eastern Shuttle and Today's Bus) were absorbed by Megabus, and BoltBus was established by Greyhound to compete with the less-expensive Chinatown buses, and has ceased operations in July 2021.

Casinos and regulation

Some bus lines transport groups of primarily Chinese and Vietnamese immigrants to and from casinos such as Wind Creek Bethlehem in Bethlehem, Pennsylvania and Foxwoods Resort Casino and Mohegan Sun in Connecticut. These casino buses grew from the popularity of older bus routes to Atlantic City, which also targeted Asian American customers.

Prior to the COVID-19 pandemic, more than 3,000 passengers daily use Chinatown bus line service between Manhattan and the Wind Creek Bethlehem casino in Bethlehem.

Increasing popularity has led to increased regulatory interest; in September 2004, Boston required all regularly-scheduled intercity bus services to operate exclusively to and from the South Station Bus Terminal. According to Steven Bailey of The Boston Globe, the move was motivated by Peter Pan and Greyhound's interest in maintaining a monopoly on the New York-Boston bus route. Massachusetts Department of Telecommunications and Energy executive director Timothy Shevlin said, "The big dog out there, Peter Pan, is dead set against Chinatown bus lines. They don't want that kind of competition." The South Station Bus Terminal has only 25 gates (in addition to two departure gates), all of which were already in use.

Organized-crime ties

The bus lines have attracted scrutiny from law-enforcement authorities for possible connections to Chinese organized crime gangs. In 2003 and 2004, bus burnings, driver assaults, murders, and other gang violence in New York City were linked to the possible infiltration of Asian organized-crime gangs in the industry.

Among the crimes associated with gang activity was a deadly shooting in May 2003 on a busy street, which may have been in retaliation for a driver backing his bus into a rival; in revenge, two buses were set on fire the following year. Fatal stabbings occurred in October 2003 and in 2004. The boyfriend of a bus-company employee was fatally shot in an apparent bus feud in January 2004, and a Chinatown bus operator was shot to death two months later. In a June 2004 incident tied to criminal gangs, two people—a Chinatown bus driver and a bystander—were murdered in a bar in Flushing, Queens; another was shot in the leg. The accused shooter was arrested in Toronto in 2011, and was extradited to the United States. After the 2004 shootings, the New York City Police Department increased its enforcement of Chinatown-bus laws.

The New York Post linked the Banya Organization with Chinatown buses in 2008; the gang allegedly assaulted employees of unidentified private bus and van companies. In 2013, police confiscated 254 guns and arrested 19 members of the largest gun-smuggling ring in New York City history. The suspects were accused of shipping guns from North Carolina and South Carolina to the northern United States on Chinatown buses. For the most part, however, bus-feud crime has subsided.

Vehicles

The fleet used by Chinatown bus lines varies from new coaches to older, pre-owned coaches. With some exceptions (such as Eastern Shuttle and routes to Boston), not all units are branded with the operator name other than required USDOT markings.

Except for Eastern Shuttle and services to Boston (which use clearly-marked buses), many Chinatown bus companies use wet leases to provide extra capacity over weekends. Some smaller companies use wet leases for their core capacity.

Service

Chinatown buses typically run nonstop express service between their departure and destination points to reduce travel time. They are slower than Amtrak and airplanes, which take 2.75 to 3.5 hours to travel from New York City to Washington, D.C.; Chinatown buses take four to five hours, usually stopping in Philadelphia. These intercity buses run at least 2,500 weekly trips.

Many competitors offer discount prices that undercut the major bus lines. Typical fares between East Coast cities range from $10 to $20, compared to major curbside bus lines (which typically cost between $1 and $25), terminal-operated bus lines ($14 to $35), and Amtrak (about $100.) The industry has become highly competitive, with companies offering hourly service between major cities. The Appalachian extensions of these lines tend to offer less of a price advantage. One-way fares from New York to Pittsburgh on the Chinese-owned All State were $35 in August 2006, compared with $45 advance through Greyhound Lines; fares from State College, Pennsylvania to New York were $35, compared to $46 for Greyhound. Chinatown buses charge flat fees, but other intercity buses may vary pricing by demand. Low prices led to high demand for many Chinatown bus routes; although one round trip may incur hundreds of dollars in expenses, a fully-booked bus can net at least $340 profit per round trip after expenses.

Ticket booths are often walk-up windows on the street or inside Chinatown restaurants and bakeries, and it is not uncommon for tickets to be sold directly on the street. Some lines collect cash payments after passengers have boarded the bus. Except in Boston, lines rarely use their own stations. Passengers are usually directed to wait at curbside for the bus, although many companies offer waiting areas at or near the pickup points. In New York, several bus lines pick up passengers along Forsyth Street at the foot of the Manhattan Bridge in Chinatown's Little Fuzhou neighborhood. Since 1998, when the New York City Department of Transportation marked it as a bus-layover area, the sidewalk between Division Street and East Broadway has been a de facto terminal for Chinatown buses.

Most operators of Chinatown bus lines have been Fujianese. Buses often do not follow their scheduled timetables; many are unreliable, sometimes skipping scheduled stops. Since there are no advertisements and (often) no websites for these bus lines, information about them is disseminated verbally.

Destinations and routes

In addition to Boston and the Chinatowns in the New York metropolitan area, several bus companies serve the Chinatowns of Edison, New Jersey; the Cherry Hill Mall; Philadelphia; Washington, D.C.; Baltimore; Atlanta, and the Atlantic City casinos. Buses also serve Ohio, Michigan, Rhode Island, Virginia and Florida, also stopping in smaller, predominately non-Chinese areas in North and South Carolina. On the West Coast, buses link the Chinatowns of the San Francisco Bay Area; Los Angeles Chinatown and the San Gabriel Valley; and Las Vegas' Chinatown and its casinos. Chinatown bus lines enable Chinese immigrants, mainly restaurant workers, to travel inexpensively along the coasts. In total, the buses travel within 24 U.S. states and Canada.

Many lines are based in New York City, where a Chinatown bus hub has been proposed. Philadelphia's Independence Transportation Center was built, in part, due to a 2007 Philadelphia Chinatown Development Corporation survey which concluded that many tourists arrived by bus and some Chinatown buses parked on the street (blocking traffic). Residents near bus stops in Philadelphia's Chinatown were more likely to complain about the buses. In Washington, D.C., bus-loading regulations were enacted in 2008 due to complaints about disruptive bus layovers. In Boston in 2004, the Massachusetts Bay Transportation Authority required Chinatown buses to have permits and stop at the South Station Bus Terminal. Although Fung Wah Bus Transportation was often ticketed for curbside parking offenses in Boston, it and Lucky Star Bus eventually headquartered at South Station because curbside-parking fines were exceeding the South Station terminal fees.

In addition to major northeastern cities, several Chinatown lines run daily from New York City to Miami. Most of the trip uses I-95, stopping near major destinations in the southern United States.

Chinatown buses go from major cities to casinos. Several Chinatown buses run from New York City to the Wind Creek Bethlehem casino resort in Bethlehem, Pennsylvania. All riders receive free-play vouchers, and some low-income (or homeless) people sell them before returning to New York.

Safety

Chinatown buses have been involved in a number of accidents, and there were 34 intercity bus accidents across the United States from 2001 to 2011. On a 2006 safety scale of 0 to 100, where 0 was the safest and 100 the most dangerous, Chinatown bus lines were rated between 71 and 99; Greyhound was rated 0. "Calculations of safety and risk are inverted," according to a 2013 City University of New York study. Curbside Chinatown buses are often more dangerous than buses which originate from terminals. Many travelers are not discouraged, however, and intercity bus accidents are rare.

After several murders in 2003–4 connected with employees of Chinatown bus companies, officials conducted a surprise inspection. In March 2011, two fatal crashes—the World Wide Tours bus crash on Interstate 95 in New York and a New Jersey Turnpike crash—led officials to confiscate six buses for inadequate brake air pressure, steering violations, and missing driver paperwork. In 2013, New York City began to fine bus operators without permits; enforcement was tightened in August 2014.

Accidents
 March 18, 2005A Boston-bound Chinatown bus operated by Lucky Star/Travel Pack stopped and evacuated its passengers on the Massachusetts Turnpike shortly before it burst into flames. No one was injured.
 August 16, 2005A New York-bound Fung Wah bus caught fire on Interstate 91 near Meriden, Connecticut. Although the passengers later criticized the driver for being unhelpful and untrained in evacuating the bus, no injuries were reported.
 January 20, 2006After a surprise inspection on Forsyth Street in Manhattan's Chinatown, two Washington-bound buses were withdrawn from service and a driver ran away from authorities.
 August 15, 2006A Shun Fa bus traveling from New York to Pittsburgh crashed. Ten passengers were injured, five of whom were hospitalized (one in critical condition).
 September 6, 2006A Fung Wah bus rolled over in Auburn, Massachusetts, injuring 34 passengers. Excessive speed was cited as a factor and the bus company was fined.
 January 3, 2007A Fung Wah bus lost its back two wheels in Framingham, Massachusetts, early in a trip to New York. No injuries were reported.
 February 14, 2007A Fung Wah bus en route to New York went out of control and struck a guardrail on the Massachusetts Turnpike (I-90) in Allston. No injuries were reported. State officials had advised Fung Wah to suspend operations because of a winter storm that day. Fung Wah reached an agreement with regulators in which its buses would be subject to inspections and driver checks for 30 days. The company agreed to improve safety, including removing unclean, unsafe buses from service.
 February 18, 2007A bus owned by Tremblay Motorcoach and operated by Sunshine Travel caught fire on the Massachusetts Turnpike near interchange 10A in Millbury, Massachusetts. All 50 passengers were evacuated, and no injuries were reported. The cause of the fire was unknown. The bus was returning to Boston's Chinatown from the Mohegan Sun casino in Uncasville, Connecticut.
 March 23, 2007A New York-bound Fung Wah bus from Boston got stuck on a cement lane divider at a tollbooth on the Massachusetts Turnpike at Route 128 in Weston, Massachusetts, when the driver tried to change lanes. No one was injured, and passengers boarded a later Fung Wah bus.
 May 20, 2007A New York-bound bus crashed in Pennsylvania, killing 2 riders and injuring 32 more.
 June 23, 2008A bus loading passengers was struck by an out-of-control dump truck at the intersection of Canal Street and the Bowery in New York's Chinatown. The impact pushed the bus onto the sidewalk and into a bank. A sign attached to a light pole fell, injuring a 57-year-old woman who later died. Several people, including two police officers, were treated for minor injuries. State Department of Transportation inspectors found that the dump truck, owned by CPQ Freight Systems, had eight mechanical issues including faulty brakes which led to the accident.
 March 12, 2011A bus operated by World Wide Tours crashed on the New England Thruway, killing 15 people.
 March 14, 2011On the New Jersey Turnpike, a bus crash killed the driver and injured 40 (two critically).

After the August 2005 bus fire, the Massachusetts Department of Telecommunications and Energy began conducting three surprise inspections per month on all bus companies leaving Boston's South Station terminal. Senator Chuck Schumer of New York proposed a four-point federal plan which would includes surprise inspections and a national safety standard for bus operators. Although New York City might institute a similar policy, inspections would be difficult since all buses do not depart from a single terminal.

Shutdowns
In 2012, the Federal Motor Carrier Safety Administration began a crackdown on Chinatown bus lines. In April 2013, the FMCSA's Operation Quick Strike teams targeted Chinatown bus drivers.

Apex BusOn May 31, 2012, the FMCSA announced the shutdown of Apex Bus, I-95 Coach, New Century Travel, and 23 related entities due to safety violations.
Fung WahOn March 2, 2013, U.S. transportation officials shut down the company's bus operations because of its refusal to provide safety records to the federal government. In December 2014, the company was authorized to resume its bus operations early the following year. The following July, however, owner Peter Liang announced the service's closure.
Lucky StarOn May 25, 2013, a bus was taken out of service when a manhole cover became lodged in its undercarriage. The company was shut down on June 5 in a Department of Transportation letter due to "Lucky Star's flagrant disregard for motor coach passenger safety". Lucky Star conducted an extensive bus upgrade and driver program over the next five months, passed required inspections, and resumed operations in November 2013.

Jim Epstein of The Daily Beast called FMCSA practices overly harsh, writing that the agency targets Chinatown bus companies because owners are rarely fluent in English. Epstein alleged that inspectors were very strict about which bus components were defective, confiscating several buses for minor issues.

See also
 Coach USA, operator of the Eastern Shuttle service
 Xe Đò Hoàng (lit. 'Hoàng Bus') or Hoang Express is an intercity bus service based in Orange County, California with a route connecting Little Saigon in Orange County with the community in San Jose.

References

Further reading

 
 Brief History of Chinatown Bus, Gotobus, updated in 2011.

 
Chinese-American history
Intercity bus companies of the United States